Mego may refer to: 

 Mego Records, an Austrian record label
 Mego Corporation, a toy company that produced action figures during the 1970s and early 1980s
 Mego (motorbikes), a Greek motorcycle manufacturer
 Mego (Kim Possible) a fictional superhero
 Mego, a subdistrict in Sikka Regency, East Nusa Tenggara, Indonesia

See also
 
 
 Mega (disambiguation)